Potamogeton hillii, common name Hill's pondweed, is a species of plant found in North America. It is listed as endangered in Connecticut, Ohio, and Pennsylvania. It is listed as a special concern in Massachusetts and as threatened in Michigan and New York (state).

References

Flora of North America
hillii